The Wrestling competition in the 2005 Summer Universiade were held in İzmir, Turkey.

Medal summary

Men's freestyle

Men's Greco-Roman

Women's freestyle

Medal table

References

External links
 Medalists

2005 Summer Universiade
Universiade
2005
2005